The 1957 Taça de Portugal Final was the final match of the 1956–57 Taça de Portugal, the 17th season of the Taça de Portugal, the premier Portuguese football cup competition organized by the Portuguese Football Federation (FPF). The match was played on 2 June 1957 at the Estádio Nacional in Oeiras, and opposed two Primeira Liga sides: Benfica and Sporting da Covilhã. Benfica defeated Sporting da Covilhã 3–1 to claim a ninth Taça de Portugal.

Match

Details

References

1957
Taca
S.L. Benfica matches
S.C. Covilhã